Newton is an unincorporated community located in the town of Newton, Manitowoc County, Wisconsin, United States. Newton has a post office with ZIP code 53063.

History
The first post office in Newton was called Timothy. The post office, established as Timothy in 1882, was renamed Newton in 1930. The present name of the community is for John Newton, an officer of the American Revolutionary War.

References

Unincorporated communities in Manitowoc County, Wisconsin
Unincorporated communities in Wisconsin